Nordic Gold (Swedish: nordiskt guld) is the gold-coloured copper alloy from which many coins are made. It has been used for a number of coins in many currencies, most notably in euro 50, 20, and 10 cents, in the Swedish 5 and 10 kronor coins (for which it was originally developed and introduced in 1991), as well as the Polish 2 złote commemorative coins. Its composition is 89% copper, 5% aluminium, 5% zinc, and 1% tin.

Being a copper alloy, it contains no gold. Its colour and density are unlike pure gold. It is non-allergenic; its other advantages include antimycotic and weak antimicrobial (especially after abrasion) attributes, and resistance to tarnishing. It has been studied for its antimicrobial hospital applications.

Nordic Gold was developed by Mariann Sundberg while she worked for the Finnish metal company Outokumpu. The European Central Bank says that the alloy is "difficult to melt and used exclusively for coins."

Properties
Compared to commercial copper metal, Nordic Gold has significantly smaller grains. A thin oxide material is formed after diamond polishing. This passivating layer contains Cu2O, which faces outward, followed by ZnO, SnO2 and Al2O3 closer to the alloy substrate. The latter three possess barrier properties.

The alloy's antimicrobial properties were studied extensively in 2014 because it showed promise for use in hospitals, to help prevent MRSA infections. A rather complete description of its electrochemical properties was one result.

References

Copper alloys
Eurozone
Coinage metals and alloys
Finnish inventions